Adrien Fainsilber (15 June 1932 – 11 February 2023) was a French architect and urbanist.

Biography
Born in Le Nouvion-en-Thiérache on 15 June 1932, Fainsilber graduated from the Beaux-Arts de Paris in 1960 and subsequently worked for Hideo Sasaki in Watertown, Massachusetts.

In 1970, Fainsilber founded his own architectural agency in Villetaneuse after winning a competition alongside Högna Sigurðardóttir. He carried out numerous projects, including the Centre Benjamin Franklin and the Villetaneuse campus of the University of Technology of Compiègne, as well as the Centre hospitalier d’Évry and different buildings of Saint-Quentin-en-Yvelines. In 1980, he was selected for a competition at the Cité des Sciences et de l'Industrie by President Valéry Giscard d'Estaing, then for one at La Géode.

In 2000, he expanded his practice and named his business Adrien Fainsilber & Associés. The year after his retirement in 2007, the company was renamed Ateliers AFA.

Fainsilber died on 11 February 2023, at the age of 90.

Distinctions
Member of the Académie d'architecture (1985)
Grand prix national de l'architecture (1986)
Knight of the Legion of Honour (1987)
Officer of the Ordre des Arts et des Lettres (1997)
Medal of Honor of the Académie d'architecture (2020)

References

1932 births
2023 deaths
French architects
People from Aisne
Members of the Académie d'architecture
École des Beaux-Arts alumni
Chevaliers of the Légion d'honneur
Recipients of the Ordre des Arts et des Lettres